The R.W. Estes Celery Company Precooler Historic District  (also known as the Nelson & Company Precooler Historic District) is a U.S. historic district (designated as such on September 20, 2001) located in Oviedo, Florida. The district is at 159 North Central Avenue. It contains 3 buildings and 2 structures.

References

External links
 Seminole County listings at National Register of Historic Places

National Register of Historic Places in Seminole County, Florida
Historic districts on the National Register of Historic Places in Florida